Mount Flume is a  mountain at the southern end of the Franconia Range in the White Mountains of New Hampshire, United States. Mount Flume is the lowest in elevation of the peaks in the Franconia Range that are accessible by official hiking trails.

The summit marks the western border of the Pemigewasset Wilderness within the White Mountain National Forest. From the summit, there are outstanding views of Franconia Notch and the Kinsman Range to the west and the Franconia Range to the north, with limited views of the Pemigewasset Wilderness and the Twin Range to the east.

Hiking 
From the north the summit is reached by the Franconia Ridge Trail coming from the summit of Mount Liberty. The Flume Slide Trail is a notably steep and slippery climb, and its use is discouraged in wet weather or snow. It is not recommended as a descending trail.

See also 

 Four-thousand footers
 White Mountains Region
 List of mountains of New Hampshire

References

Mountains of New Hampshire
Mountains of Grafton County, New Hampshire
New England Four-thousand footers